The 10th Nuestra Belleza México pageant, was held at the Teatro del Arte of Morelia, Michoacán, Mexico on September 5, 2003. Thirty-eight contestants of the Mexican Republic competed for the national title, which was won by Rosalva Luna from Sinaloa, who later competed in Miss Universe 2004 in Ecuador where she was a Semifinalist in the Top 15. Luna was crowned by outgoing Nuestra Belleza México titleholder Marisol González. She was the first Sinaloense to win this Title.

The Nuestra Belleza Mundo México title was won by Yessica Ramírez from Baja California, who later competed in Miss World 2004 in China where she was a Semifinalist in the Top 15. Ramírez was crowned by outgoing Nuestra Belleza Mundo México titleholder Blanca Zumárraga. She is the first and only Bajacaliforniana to win this title.

This year was established the "Corona al Mérito" award. Recognition is given each year to a Queen or ex-Queen of Nuestra Belleza México, for their work and/or trajectory dignify human values and the image of Mexican women in beauty contests, hoping to motivate them to excel day. The first prize winner of the "Corona al Mérito" went to Carolina Salinas, Nuestra Belleza Nuevo León 2002 and Miss Expo World 2002.

Results

Placements

Preliminary Competition
For the first time, the Preliminary Competition was held at the "Hoy" TV show a few days before of the final competition. Prior to the final telecast, all contestants competed in swimsuit during the preliminary competition, included corporal expression category.

In this program were chosen the Top 20 among the 38 candidates. Only the top 20 participated in the final night. The Preliminary Competition was hosted by Andrea Legarreta and Ernesto Laguardia.

The musical part was enlivened by: Belinda.

Order of announcements
In addition, the names of the semifinalists who would compete on the final night they met.

Nuevo León
Durango
Tamaulipas
Sonora
Nuevo León
Sinaloa
Sonora
Guanajuato
Jalisco
Tamaulipas

Nuevo León
Michoacán
Zacatecas
Baja California
Estado de México
Chihuahua
Distrito Federal
Aguascalientes
Puebla
Yucatán

Special awards

Judges

Preliminary Competition
Liliana Abud - Writer and Actress
Mara Patricia Castañeda - TV Hostess
Lourdes Lusage
Mauricio Peña
Mario de la Regera
Adriana César
Francisco Mendoza
Angel Papadopolus - Plastic Surgeon
Willy Graw
José Luis Reséndez - El Modelo México 2003

Final Competition
Joss Ifergan - Stylist
Ángel Papadopolus - Plastic Surgeon
Cristina Pineda - Fashion Designer
Guillermo Rojas - Automobile Broker
Tatiana Rodríguez - Nuestra Belleza Mundo México 2001 & Actress
Ana Margara Rodríguez - Professional Model
Jan - Actor & Singer
Gabriela Goldsmith - Actress
René Casados - Actor & TV Host

Background music
Opening Number: "Medley of the host State" by Contestants
Intermediate: "Vives en Mí", "Inspiración" by Benny Ibarra
Intermediate: "Tu Amor o tu Desprecio" by Marco Antonio Solis
Crowning Moment: "Nuestra Belleza México" (Official Theme)

Contestants

Designates

 - Karla Beceraa
 - Karla Ayála
 - Esther Alejandra Córdova
 - Norma González
 - Gladyas Anaya
 - Paola Topete
 - Alejandra Arredondo

 - Brisseida Moya
 - Lorelí Cázarez
 - Grisel Franco
 - Amada Castillo
 - Yadira Patiño
 - Cecilia Magallanes

Returning states
Last competed in 1999:

Last competed in 2001:

 Estado de México

Withdrawals

Significance
Sinaloa won the Nuestra Belleza México title for the first time.
Baja California won the Nuestra Belleza Mundo México title for the first time.
Nuevo León was the Suplente/1st Runner-up for the first time.
This was the fourth time a Winner of Nuestra Belleza México pageant is not born in the state that represents, (Yessica Ramírez was born in Culiacán, Sinaloa).
For the first time Coahuila, Chiapas, San Luis Potosí and  Tabasco retires from competition.
Baja California Sur and Estado de México return to competition after three year (2001) and Guerrero after four years (1999).
Chiahuahua placed for sixth consecutive year.
Sonora and Tamaulipas placed for fifth consecutive year
Yucatán placed for fourth consecutive year.
Puebla placed for second consecutive year.
Michoacán placed for the first time.
Baja California, Durango and  Estado de México returned to making calls to the semifinals after six years (1997), Aguascalientes after four years (1999), Zacatecas after three years (2000), Distrito Federal, Guanajuato, Nuevo León and Jalisco after two years (2001).
States that were called to the semifinals last year and this year failed to qualify were Morelos, Querétaro and Veracruz.
For the first time Ernesto Laguardia hosted the pageant.
Zacatecas won Miss Photogenic for the first time.
Nuevo León won Fuller Beauty Queen and Lala Light Figure Award for the first time.
Sinaloa won the Best National Costume for the second time (after 1994)
The host delegate, Yaminah Márquez from Michoacán, placed to semifinals.
Baja California (Yessia Ramírez) and Nuevo León (Brisseida Moya) are the higher delegates in this edition (1.83 m).
Guerrero (Lilián Cepeda) is the lower delegate in this edition (1.68 m).

Contestants notes
 - Yessica Ramírez represented Mexico in Miss World 2004 held at the Crown of Beauty Theatre, Sanya, People's Republic of China on December 6, 2004. She got a direct pass amongst the top 15 by being awarded the Miss World Top Model award for 2004. She also took Mexico back to be part of the semifinalists after a 7-year drought of no placement, from here on Mexico classified consecutively. She was born in Culiacán, Sinaloa.
 - Alejandra Córdoba represented Mexico in Miss Teen Mayan World 2003.
 - Norma González represented Mexico in Miss Expo World 2003 where she won the Miss Personality award. Also she competed in Miss Pacific of the World 2007 where she won 1st Place.
 - Brisseida Moya represented Mexico in the Reinado Internacional del Café 2004 in Manizales, Colombia.
 - Beatríz Herrero is sister of Irantzu Herrero, designated of Puebla in Nuestra Belleza México 2005.
 - Rosalva Luna ranked on the top 15 in Miss Universe 2004 held in Centro de Convenciones CEMEXPO in Guayaquil, Ecuador, ending Mexico's 4-year drought without any placement, from here on Mexico classified consecutively until Karla Carrillo, who didn't qualify to semifinals in Miss Universe 2009.
 - Alejandra Celis is sister of Adriana Celis, Nuestra Belleza Tamaulipas 2006.
 - Yadira Patiño competed in the contest Miss Latin America 2008 held in Punta Cana, Dominican Republic representing Mexico, ended up as a semifinalist. Also she competed in Miss Atlántico Internacional 2008 in Punta del Este, Uruguay but she didn't place.
 - Marisol Rojas won the Title of Miss Costa Maya International 2004 held in Belize representing Mexico.

Crossovers

Contestants who had competed or will compete at other beauty pageants:

Miss Universe
 2004: : Rosalva Luna (Top 15)

Miss World
 2004: : Yessica Ramírez (Top 15)

Miss Latin America
 2008: : Yadira Patiño (Top 12)

Miss Atlántico Internacional
 2008: : Yadira Patiño

Reinado Internacional del Café
 2004: : Brisseida Moya (Top 10)

Miss Costa Maya International
 2004: : Marisol Rojas (Winner)

Miss Pacific of the World
 2007: : Norma González (Winner)

Miss Expo World
 2003: : Norma González

Miss Teen Mayan World
 2003: : Alejandra Córdoba

References

External links
Official Website

.Mexico
2003 in Mexico
2003 beauty pageants